Love in the Time of Corona is an American romantic comedy television miniseries created by Joanna Johnson that premiered on Freeform on August 22, 2020. The title is a play on the title of the novel Love in the Time of Cholera.

Premise
Love in the Time of Corona follows lives of people who are looking for "love, sex and connection" during the COVID-19 pandemic while social distancing.

Cast and characters

Main

 Ava Bellows as Sophie
 Gil Bellows as Paul
 L. Scott Caldwell as Nanda
 Tommy Dorfman as Oscar
 Rya Kihlstedt as Sarah
 Leslie Odom Jr. as James
 Rainey Qualley as Elle
 Nicolette Robinson as Sade

Recurring
 Emilio Garcia-Sanchez as Adam
 Jordan Gavaris as Sean
 Charlie Robinson as Charles
 Tyler Alvarez as Jordan
 Gail Bean as Adeah
 Catero Alan Colbert as Dedrick
Chelsea Zhang as Kaia

This is Charlie Robinson's final TV work before his passing in July 2021.

Episodes

Production

Development
On May 7, 2020, it was reported that Freeform had given the production a straight-to-series order consisting of four parts. Love in the Time of Corona is executive produced by Joanna Johnson, Christine Sacani, and Robyn Meisinger. Anonymous Content is involved with producing the series.

Casting
On June 29, 2020, it was announced that  Leslie Odom Jr., Nicolette Robinson, Tommy Dorfman, Rainey Qualley, Gil Bellows, Rya Kihlstedt, Ava Bellows, and L. Scott Caldwell were cast in starring roles.

Filming
Production began virtually on June 29, 2020 in Los Angeles using remote technologies.
on Freeform on August 22, 2020.

Release
The miniseries premiered on August 22, 2020, on Freeform in the United States. In selected international territories, the series is available on Disney+ under the dedicated streaming hub Star as an original series, since March 12, 2021.

Reception

Critical response
 
On the review aggregator website Rotten Tomatoes, the series holds an approval rating of 58% based on 12 reviews. On Metacritic, the series holds a rating of 55 out of 100, based on 12 critics, indicating "mixed or average reviews".

Accolades 
Love in the Time of Corona was one of the IMDbPro Top 200 Scripted TV Recipients for the ReFrame Stamp in 2021.

References

External links 

2020 American television series debuts
2020 American television series endings
2020s American romantic comedy television series
2020s American television miniseries
English-language television shows
Freeform (TV channel) original programming
Cultural responses to the COVID-19 pandemic
Television series by Anonymous Content
Television shows about the COVID-19 pandemic